The buffy tuftedcheek or Lawrence's tuftedcheek (Pseudocolaptes lawrencii) is a passerine bird in the ovenbird family, which breeds in the tropical New World in Costa Rica and western Panama. It is sometimes considered conspecific with the streaked tuftedcheek, P. boissonneautii, of South America. 

It occurs as a resident breeder above  in wet mountain forests with many epiphytes. The female lays one white egg in a thickly lined old woodpecker nest. One parent, probably the female, incubates the single white egg for 29 days to hatching, covering the egg with leaves when she leaves the nest.

The back is brown, and the wings are blackish with buff wingbars. The head has a buff-streaked dark brown cap and dusky eyestripe. The cheeks sport a tuft of richly buff feathers. The throat is buff and the underparts are olive brown with diffuse spotting on the breast. The sexes are similar, but young birds lack the buff crown streaks, have more sooty marking on the back and underparts, and their flanks are more orange in hue.

This species has a hard wooden  song, often given as a duet. The call is a sharp chip.

The buffy tuftedcheek forages actively amongst mosses, vines, bromeliads and other epiphytes for insects, spiders, and even small amphibians. It will join mixed feeding flocks in the middle levels of the forest.
 
The scientific and alternative English names of this bird commemorate American amateur ornithologist, George Newbold Lawrence.

References

 Stiles and Skutch,  A guide to the birds of Costa Rica

Further reading

buffy tuftedcheek
Birds of Costa Rica
Birds of Panama
buffy tuftedcheek
Taxa named by Robert Ridgway